Albert Head is a neighbourhood in Metchosin, British Columbia, Canada, part of the Western Communities area of Greater Victoria, British Columbia, Canada. It is located around and named after the headland of Albert Head, which is Department of National Defence property.  Canadian Forces Base (CFB) Esquimalt operates CFB Albert Head which contains the British Columbia Canadian Ranger Company of the 4th Canadian Ranger Patrol Group, CFB Esquimalt Range Control, and the Regional Cadet Support Unit (Pacific) which hosts Cadet summer training at the camp. Albert Head Lagoon derives its name from the headland that was named by the Royal Navy for Prince Albert.

Headland
The neighbourhood of Albert Head is located on the headland of Albert Head, named for Prince Albert, consort of Queen Victoria.

Lagoon
Albert Head Lagoon was officially named after the headland of Albert Head in 1977, due to that name being long-established in local usage.

See also
List of World War II-era fortifications on the British Columbia Coast

References

Greater Victoria
Populated places in the Capital Regional District
World War II sites in Canada